Sablauskiai is a village in the centre of the Akmenė district municipality, in Šiauliai County, in northwest Lithuania. The Sablauskių Pagrindinė Mokykla can be found here. The 1013 Alkiškiai–Sablauskiai–Barsiukai road goes through Sablauskiai. According to the 2011 census, Sablauskiai has a population of 422 people. The village is famous for limestone sources and the reservoir named after the village (Sablauskių Reservoir).

References

Akmenė District Municipality
Villages in Šiauliai County